Early Live Recordings is a compilation album by American singer-songwriter and musician Ariel Pink. It was released on December 17, 2013, through Human Ear Music record label. The album features Pink's early live recordings in the late 1990s and early 2000s under the aliases "Gorilla" and "Appleasians".

The tracks were saved from the same series CD-R and eight-track cassettes that spawned Thrash & Burn, Ariel Pink's previously unreleased late-1990s musique concrète album that was released in 2006 and reissued in 2012. The  compilation also features a cover of the Shaggs song, "My Cutie".

Critical reception

Allmusic critic Heather Phares gave the album a positive review, stating: "Coupled with Thrash & Burn, Early Live Recordings delivers an entertainingly fleshed-out portrait of Pink's pre-Haunted Graffiti years." Andy Beta of Pitchfork was mixed in his assessment of the album, writing: "While excavating the eight Haunted Graffiti albums revealed repulsive and alluring sounds in equal measure, Early Live Recordings only real crime is that little of it fascinates."

Track listing
Gorilla	
 "Berzerker"
 "Logan's Run"
 "Chunga"
 "El Fantastic Summer, Pt. 1"
 "Lila Lay"
 "Die He Die"
 "I'm Burning Up"
 "Why Am I So Sad"
 "Nazi Love"
 "Darby's Revenge"
 "Not Her Home Yet"
 "I Sold My Soul"
 "Dancing In the Darkness"
 "Zip Drive"
 "By the Powers of Grayskull"
 "Damo's CD"
 "Funeral In an Aircraft"
 "Farewell Goodbye"

Appleasians
	
 "Tractor Man"
 "Inside Looking Out"
 "Something In Your Eye"
 "Nana"
 "Crusades"
 "Don't Turn Back"
 "Who Has Scene the Ween"
 "Nana Reprise"
 "My Cutie" (The Shaggs cover)
 "I Lied To Her"
 "Shelly Come Out Tonite"
 "Don't Turn Back"
 "In the Dungeon"
 "Inside Looking Out"
 "The Appleasians"
 "Art Life"
 "Red Scare"
 "2008"

References

External links
 Ariel Pink - Early Live Recordings on Human Ear Music

2013 compilation albums
2013 live albums
Ariel Pink albums
Lo-fi music albums